Minsky (Belarusian: Мінскі; Russian: Минский) is a family name originating in Eastern Europe.

People
Hyman Minsky (1919–1996), American economist
Marvin Minsky (1927–2016), American cognitive scientist in the field of Artificial Intelligence
Michael Minsky (1918–1988), Russian opera singer
Morton Minsky (1902–1987), burlesque theater owner
Nikolai Minsky (1855–1937), Russian poet
Richard Minsky (born 1947), American scholar of bookbinding
Richard Allen Minsky (born 1944), American convicted criminal
Terri Minsky, American television writer and producer

Other uses
Minsky's Burlesque, a brand of American burlesque, 1912–1937
The Night They Raided Minsky's, a 1968 film
Minsky's, a musical play loosely based on the film
Minsky (economic simulator), an open source visual computer program for dynamic modelling of monetary economies.

See also
Minsk, Belarus